The Warjih, also known as Wargar or Tigri-Warjih, are an ethnic group inhabiting Ethiopia. The prefix for their traditional name, Tigri, comes from the word Tijaari, which is an adjective in the Arabic language that literally translates to "merchant." Their tribal name Warjih is eponymous with the name of their ancestral homeland. Thus, Tigri-Warjih essentially means "merchant of Warjih."

History
According to the Warjih, their forefathers have two separate origins, one ancestor emerging from Tigray region while the other arrived from Hararghe. The Warjih more commonly state they originate from Harar. Warjih are credited for transmitting Semitic influences into Shewa from their departure point in the Harari plateau. The Warjih were among the first people in the Horn of Africa to become Muslim, having accepted Islam by the eighth century. Alongside another ancient Muslim group to their west, the Gebel, who would eventually procreate the Argobba people. Warjih were under the Sultanate of Shewa in the ninth century. The Warjih in the following centuries participated in many battles against Christian Abyssinia. They sided with the Ifat in the Middle Ages, and Adal Sultanate during the Ethiopian-Adal War. It was this time of military conflict that opened the door for the northern expansion of Oromos, and thus began the assimilation of conquered populations, such as the Warjih. It is based on this historical tale that some members classify themselves as a separate ethnicity. Nonetheless, there is no doubt that over centuries of living among Oromos, the Warjih have well assimilated, with no cultural distinction evident between the two.

Demographics
The Warjih historically populated an area in south-eastern Ethiopia within what is now Oromia Region. Today, they are found primarily in their modern hometown of Daleti and in numerous pastoral communities scattered throughout the regions of Shewa and Wollo. Some have settled in major cities within these former provinces, most prominently in Addis Ababa and Kemise. Due to their longstanding livelihoods as merchants, members of the Warjih community can be found transiently in cities all across Ethiopia

According to the 2007 Ethiopian census carried out by the Central Statistical Agency, the Warjih population numbered 13,232 individuals.

Language
The Warjih today primarily speak Afaan Oromoo as their mother tongue (14,066 in 1994) and Amharic as a second language, although this order of primacy may be vice versa depending on where a person lives. Both languages belong to the larger Afro-Asiatic family.

Politics
Prior to the 2010 Ethiopian general election, the current Ethiopian regime approved the creation of the Tigri Worgi Nationality Democratic Organization, which represents a minority of the tribe.

See also
 Wargar, clan once inhabiting Adal

Notes

References
 Grover Hudson, "Linguistic Analysis of the 1994 Ethiopian Census", Northeast African Studies, Volume 6, Number 3, 1999 (New Series), pp. 89 – 107.
 Pankhurst, Richard K.P. The Ethiopian Royal Chronicles. Addis Ababa: Oxford University Press, Inc., 1967
 Pankhurst, Borderlands, p. 79.

Ethnic groups in Ethiopia
Muslim communities in Africa